Enrique "Quique" Sánchez Flores (born 5 February 1965) is a Spanish former footballer who played as a right-back, currently manager of Getafe.

He began his professional career with Valencia in 1984, going on to amass La Liga totals of 304 games and 16 goals over 12 seasons and also appearing for Real Madrid and Zaragoza in the competition, retiring in 1997. Internationally, he represented Spain at under-18, under-21 and under-23 levels, appearing with the senior side at the 1990 World Cup.

In 2001, Flores began his managerial career when he took charge of Real Madrid's youth team. His first senior post came in 2004, with Getafe. He returned to Valencia in 2005, being dismissed after two years and going on to work with Benfica, Atlético Madrid – where he won the 2010 Europa League – Al-Ahli, Al-Ain and Watford, before being appointed at Espanyol in 2016.

Playing career
Born in Madrid, Flores spent his first ten years as a senior with Valencia CF, starting in 1984–85. The club was relegated in his second season, and when it returned to La Liga in the 1987–88 campaign, finished 14th. However, from that point until 1994 the team never ranked lower than seventh, with him as first-choice.

Flores moved to Real Madrid in summer 1994 on a four-year contract, and stayed with the capital side for two seasons, winning the league title in the first one but being deemed surplus to requirements early into the 1996 preseason after complaining to newly-arrived manager Fabio Capello of toenail pains. Subsequently, he had a brief spell with Real Zaragoza, retiring from professional football at the age of 32 with Spanish top-flight totals of 304 games and 16 goals; in his only season in the Segunda División, as Valencia won the championship, he posted career-highs with 40 matches and nine goals.

Flores made 15 appearances for the Spain national team, and was included in the 1990 FIFA World Cup squad. His debut came on 23 September 1987, in a 2–0 friendly win against Luxembourg in Castellón de la Plana.

Coaching career

Beginnings
Flores began his coaching career in 2001 by taking charge of Real Madrid's youth teams. After earning plaudits during his three seasons in the youth teams he caught the eye of the newly promoted Getafe CF, also in Madrid.

Valencia
After the 2004–05 campaign with Getafe, in which they finished in 13th place, Flores was given the opportunity to coach his former club Valencia, succeeding Claudio Ranieri. In his first year, he guided them to third place and thus qualified for the UEFA Champions League where the team went on to reach the quarter-finals, being knocked out by Chelsea.

In May 2007, the Che achieved a top-four league finish and consequently a place in the next Champions League. On 29 October, however, the board of directors dismissed Flores after a string of poor results.

Benfica
Flores was appointed as manager of S.L. Benfica on 24 May 2008. On 8 June of the following year he left the Primeira Liga side by mutual consent, after a third place in the league and winning the domestic league cup.

Atlético Madrid
On 23 October 2009, Flores signed for Atlético Madrid following the dismissal of Abel Resino, penning a contract until 30 June 2010. At the end of the campaign, he led the team to the ninth position in the domestic competition, but also to two cup finals: the UEFA Europa League against Fulham (2–1 win) and the Copa del Rey, lost to Sevilla FC.

Frequently clashing with star player Diego Forlán during 2010–11, Flores announced his departure from the Colchoneros before the season ended, with the team finally qualifying to the Europa League.

Al Ahli
In early May 2011, Flores was linked with a move to FC Spartak Moscow. On 8 November, however, he was named new coach of UAE Pro League team Al Ahli Dubai FC, replacing Ivan Hašek. He left on 11 June 2013.

Al Ain
On 28 September 2013, only three months after leaving the country, Flores returned to the United Arab Emirates, being appointed at Al Ain FC. However, his tenure was brief as he was dismissed on 8 March 2014 due to poor results.

Return to Getafe
After nearly nine months without a club, Flores returned to Getafe on 5 January 2015 to succeed Cosmin Contra as the new manager following the latter's departure to China. His first match in charge took place two days later, and it ended with a 1–1 away draw against UD Almería for the domestic cup; on 26 February, however, citing personal reasons, he resigned.

Watford
On 5 June 2015, Flores was appointed the head coach of newly promoted Premier League side Watford, replacing Slaviša Jokanović and being the fifth man to hold that position in twelve months. In December, the team won three and lost only one of their league matches, earning him the Premier League Manager of the Month accolade; his forward Odion Ighalo earned the equivalent award for his five-goal haul that month.

However, despite going on to lead the team to a comfortable mid-table position and the semi-finals of the FA Cup, it was announced on 13 May 2016 that Flores would be leaving at the end of the season.

Espanyol
On 9 June 2016, Flores returned to Spain, signing a three-year deal to replace Constantin Gâlcă as manager of RCD Espanyol. His second signing was José Antonio Reyes, with whom he had previously worked at Benfica and Atlético.

Flores was dismissed on 20 April 2018, after achieving poor results towards the end of the season. In July, he was on a four-man shortlist for the vacant Egyptian national team manager job.

Shanghai Shenhua
On 25 December 2018, Flores was appointed manager of Chinese club Shanghai Greenland Shenhua FC. The following July, he left.

Return to Watford
Flores returned to Watford on 7 September 2019, replacing his compatriot Javi Gracia who was dismissed the same day. His team completed a comeback from 2–0 down to draw 2–2 with Arsenal at Vicarage Road in his first game back on 15 September. However, one week later, they were defeated 8–0 at the City of Manchester Stadium by Manchester City, with the opposition scoring five goals in the first 15 minutes for their biggest ever Premier League win.

On 30 November 2019, Watford went away to Southampton and lost 2–1. The next day, Flores was sacked after securing only a single victory in his second stint in charge.

Third Getafe spell
On 6 October 2021, Flores was presented as Getafe manager for the third time.

Personal life
Flores is the nephew of flamenco singer and dancer Lola Flores. His father, Isidro Sánchez García-Figueras, was also a footballer and a defender, and Alfredo Di Stéfano was his godfather.

Managerial statistics

Honours

Player
Valencia
Segunda División: 1986–87

Real Madrid
La Liga: 1994–95

Spain U21
UEFA European Under-21 Championship: 1986

Manager
Benfica
Taça da Liga: 2008–09

Atlético Madrid
UEFA Europa League: 2009–10
UEFA Super Cup: 2010
Copa del Rey runner-up: 2009–10

Al Ahli
UAE League Cup: 2011–12
UAE President's Cup: 2012–13

Al Ain
UAE President's Cup: 2013–14

Individual
Premier League Manager of the Month: December 2015

References

External links

CiberChe stats and bio 

1965 births
Living people
Spanish footballers
Footballers from Madrid
Association football defenders
La Liga players
Segunda División players
Valencia CF players
Real Madrid CF players
Real Zaragoza players
Spain youth international footballers
Spain under-21 international footballers
Spain under-23 international footballers
Spain international footballers
1990 FIFA World Cup players
Spanish football managers
La Liga managers
Getafe CF managers
Valencia CF managers
Atlético Madrid managers
RCD Espanyol managers
Primeira Liga managers
S.L. Benfica managers
UAE Pro League managers
Al Ain FC managers
Premier League managers
Watford F.C. managers
Chinese Super League managers
Shanghai Shenhua F.C. managers
UEFA Europa League winning managers
Spanish expatriate football managers
Expatriate football managers in Portugal
Expatriate football managers in the United Arab Emirates
Expatriate football managers in England
Expatriate football managers in China
Spanish expatriate sportspeople in Portugal
Spanish expatriate sportspeople in the United Arab Emirates
Spanish expatriate sportspeople in England
Spanish expatriate sportspeople in China
Real Madrid CF non-playing staff